Rachid Rguig (born September 1, 1980) is a Moroccan judoka, who played for the half-lightweight category. He won a silver medal for his division at the 2009 African Judo Championships in Port Louis, Mauritius, and bronze at the 2008 African Judo Championships in Agadir, Morocco.

Rguig represented Morocco at the 2008 Summer Olympics in Beijing, where he competed for the men's half-lightweight class (66 kg). He received a bye for the second preliminary round match, before losing out, by an ippon (full point) and a juji gatame (back-lying perpendicular armbar), to France's Benjamin Darbelet. Because his opponent advanced further into the final match, Rguig offered another shot for the bronze medal by entering the repechage rounds. Unfortunately, he was defeated in his first match by Canada's Sasha Mehmedovic, who successfully scored a waza-ari awasete ippon (full point) and a kata gatame (shoulder hold), at two minutes and thirty-six seconds.

References

External links

NBC 2008 Olympics profile

Moroccan male judoka
Living people
Olympic judoka of Morocco
Judoka at the 2008 Summer Olympics
1980 births
20th-century Moroccan people
21st-century Moroccan people